Exerodonta sumichrasti (common name: Sumichrast's treefrog) is a species of frog in the family Hylidae. It is endemic to Mexico and known from the Pacific slopes of southern Mexico in the Guerrero, Oaxaca, and Chiapas states as well as from the Chiapan highlands.

Description
Adult males measure  and adult females  in snout–vent length. The head is broad and flat and with a long and pointed snout in dorsal profile. The tympanum is distinct but sometimes covered by skin posteroventrally. The arms are short and robust, with short and stout fingers bearing moderately large discs; the fingers are partially webbed. The legs are also relatively short and robust. The toes are moderately long and slender. They bear discs that are slightly smaller than the finger discs; the toes are three-quarters webbed. The dorsal coloration is variable, ranging from a nearly uniform pale green or grayish green to yellowish tan or pale brown. Some specimens have minute, darker flecks.

Habitat and conservation
It is often found in arboreal bromeliads in the dry season. Breeding takes place in streams. Although  a common species, it is threatened by habitat loss.

References

sumichrasti
Endemic amphibians of Mexico
Fauna of the Sierra Madre del Sur
Fauna of the Southern Pacific dry forests
Amphibians described in 1879
Taxa named by Paul Brocchi
Taxonomy articles created by Polbot